Vachad (also Romanized as Vachād) is a village in Sorkhkola Rural District, in the Central District of Savadkuh County, Mazandaran Province, Iran. At the 2006 census, its population was 89, in 20 families.

References 

Populated places in Savadkuh County